Trochoidea is a superfamily of small to very large vetigastropod sea snails with gills and an operculum. Species within this superfamily have nacre as the inner shell layer. The families within this superfamily include the Trochidae, the top snails. This superfamily is the largest vetigastropodan superfamily, containing more than 2,000 species.

This taxon is not the same as a pulmonate land snail genus which is spelled the same way: Trochoidea (genus).

Taxonomy

2005 taxonomy 
This superfamily consisted of nine following families (according to the taxonomy of the Gastropoda by Bouchet & Rocroi, 2005):

 Trochidae Rafinesque, 1815
 Calliostomatidae Thiele, 1924 (1847)
 † Elasmonematidae Knight, 1956
 † Eucochlidae Bandel, 2002
 † Microdomatidae Wenz, 1938
 † Proconulidae Cox, 1960
 Solariellidae Powell, 1951 - synonym: Minoliinae Kuroda, Habe & Oyama, 1971
 † Tychobraheidae Horný, 1992
 † Velainellidae Vasseur, 1880

2017 taxonomy 
Williams et al. (2008) have made further refinements to the  taxonomy of Trochoidea.  The revised taxonomy as defined by Bouchet et al. (2017) resulted in the following families. The fossil families, tentatively included in this list, are based on Tracey et al. (1993) 
 Angariidae Gray, 1857
 † Anomphalidae Wenz, 1938 
 † Araeonematidae Nützel, 2012
 Areneidae McLean, 2012
 Calliostomatidae Thiele, 1924 (1847)
 Colloniidae Cossmann, 1917
 Conradiidae Golikov & Starobogatov, 1987
 † Elasmonematidae Knight, 1956
 † Epulotrochidae Gründel, Keupp & Lang, 2017
 † Eucochlidae Bandel, 2002
 Liotiidae Gray, 1850
 Margaritidae Thiele, 1924
 †Metriomphalidae Gründel, Keupp & Lang, 2017 
 † Microdomatidae Wenz, 1938 
 †Nododelphinulidae Cox, 1960 
 Phasianellidae Swainson, 1840
 † Proconulidae Cox, 1960 
 † Sclarotrardidae Gründel, Keupp & Lang, 2017
 Skeneidae Clark W., 1851
 Solariellidae Powell, 1951
 Tegulidae Kuroda, Habe & Oyama, 1971
 Trochidae Rafinesque, 1815
 Turbinidae Rafinesque, 1815
 † Tychobraheidae Horný, 1992 
 † Velainellidae Vasseur, 1880 
Unassigned to a family:
 Margarella Thiele, 1893 - Margarella rosea belongs to Cantharidinae, but Margarella antarctica belongs to Calliostomatidae/Thysanodontinae as Carinastele antarctica.
Nomen dubium
 Ataphridae Cossmann, 1915 
Families brought into synonymy
 Crosseolidae Hickman, 2013: synonym of Conradiidae Golikov & Starobogatov, 1987
 Cyclostrematidae P. Fischer, 1865: synonym of Liotiidae Gray, 1850
 Delphinulidae Stoliczka, 1868: synonym of Angariidae Gray, 1857
 Gazidae  Hickman & McLean, 1990: synonym of Margaritidae Thiele, 1924
 Minoliinae Kuroda, Habe & Oyama, 1971: synonym of Solariellidae Powell, 1951
 † Parataphrinae Calzada, 1989: synonym of † Proconulidae Cox, 1960 
 Stomatellidae Gray, 1840: synonym of Stomatellinae Gray, 1840
 Stomatiidae Carpenter, 1861: synonym of Stomatellinae Gray, 1840
 Tricoliidae Woodring, 1928: synonym of Tricoliinae Woodring, 1928 (rank change)

References 

 Hickman C. S. & McLean J. H. (1990). Systematic revision and suprageneric classification of trochacean gastropods. Science Series of Natural History Museum of Los Angeles County 35: 1-169 
 Hickman C.S. (1992). Reproduction and development of Trochacean gastropods. The Veliger. 35(4): 245-272
 
 Suzanne T. Williams (2012), Advances in molecular systematics of the vetigastropod superfamily Trochoidea; Zoologica Scripta Volume 41, Issue 6, pages 571–595, November 2012

 
Gastropod superfamilies
Marine gastropods
Taxa named by Constantine Samuel Rafinesque